Tamara Petrovna Tikhonina (born February 22, 1937) is a former Soviet competitive volleyball player and Olympic silver medalist.

References

External links
 

Soviet women's volleyball players
Olympic volleyball players of the Soviet Union
Volleyball players at the 1964 Summer Olympics
Olympic silver medalists for the Soviet Union
1937 births
Living people
Sportspeople from Baku
Russian women's volleyball players
Olympic medalists in volleyball
Medalists at the 1964 Summer Olympics